The , also referred to as the Imperial Family or the House of Yamato, is the royal family of Japan, consisting of those members of the extended family of the reigning Emperor of Japan who undertake official and public duties. Under the present Constitution of Japan, the Emperor is "the symbol of the State and of the unity of the people". Other members of the Imperial Family perform ceremonial and social duties, but have no role in the affairs of government. The duties as an Emperor are passed down the line to their male children. This Japanese monarchy is the oldest continuous hereditary monarchy in the world. The Imperial House recognizes 126 monarchs, beginning with Emperor Jimmu (traditionally dated to 11 February 660 BC), and continuing up to the current emperor, Naruhito. However, scholars have agreed that there is no evidence of Jimmu's existence, that the traditional narrative of Japan’s founding is mythical, and that Jimmu is a mythical figure. Historical evidence for the first 25 emperors is mythical, but there is sufficient evidence of an unbroken hereditary line since the early 6th century. Historically verifiable Emperors of Japan start from AD 539 with Emperor Kinmei.

List of current members

The  is the head of the Japanese imperial family.

After the removal of 11 collateral branches from the Imperial House in October 1947, the official membership of the Imperial Family has effectively been limited to the male-line descendants of the Emperor Taishō, excluding females who married outside the Imperial Family and their descendants.

There are currently 17 members of the Imperial Family:
The Emperor, the eldest son and first child of the Emperor Emeritus Akihito and the Empress Emerita Michiko, was born in the Hospital of the Imperial Household in Tokyo on 23 February 1960. He became heir apparent upon his father's accession to the throne. Crown Prince Naruhito was married on 9 June 1993 to Masako Owada. On 1 May 2019, he ascended to the Chrysanthemum Throne and became emperor upon the abdication of his father (2019 Japanese imperial transition).
 The Empress was born on 9 December 1963, the daughter of Hisashi Owada, a former vice minister of foreign affairs and former permanent representative of Japan to the United Nations. She became empress consort upon her husband's succession to the throne on 1 May 2019. 
 The Princess Toshi was born on 1 December 2001, and is the only child of Emperor Naruhito and Empress Masako.

 The Crown Prince Akishino, the Emperor Emeritus' second son, the Emperor's younger brother and the current heir presumptive. He was born on 30 November 1965 in the Hospital of the Imperial Household in Tokyo. His childhood title was The Prince Aya. He received the title The Prince Akishino and permission to start a new branch of the Imperial Family upon his marriage to Kiko Kawashima on 29 June 1990.
The Crown Princess Akishino was born on 11 September 1966, the daughter of Tatsuhiko Kawashima, professor of economics at Gakushuin University. Crown Prince and Princess Akishino have two daughters (one of whom remains a member of the Imperial Family) and a son:
 Princess Kako of Akishino (born 29 December 1994), the second daughter of the Crown Prince Akishino.
 Prince Hisahito of Akishino (born 6 September 2006), the first male born to the Imperial Household since his father 41 years before.

The Princess Mikasa is the widow of The Prince Mikasa (2 December 1915 – 27 October 2016), the fourth son of Emperor Taishō and Empress Teimei and a great-uncle of Emperor Naruhito. The Princess was born on 4 June 1923, the second daughter of Viscount Masanori Takagi. The Princess Mikasa has two daughters and three sons with the late Prince Mikasa.
 Princess Tomohito of Mikasa is the widow of Prince Tomohito of Mikasa (5 January 1946 – 6 June 2012), the eldest son of the Prince and Princess Mikasa and a first cousin once removed of Emperor Naruhito. The Princess was born on 9 April 1955, the daughter of Takakichi Asō, chairman of Asō Cement Co., and his wife, Kazuko, a daughter of former Prime Minister Shigeru Yoshida. She has two daughters with the late Prince Tomohito of Mikasa:
 Princess Akiko of Mikasa (born 20 December 1981)
 Princess Yōko of Mikasa (born 25 October 1983)
 The Princess Takamado is the widow of The Prince Takamado (29 December 1954 – 21 November 2002), the third son of the Prince and Princess Mikasa and a first cousin once removed of Emperor Naruhito. The Princess was born 10 July 1953, the eldest daughter of Shigejiro Tottori. She married the prince on 6 December 1984. Originally known as Prince Norihito of Mikasa, he received the title The Prince Takamado and permission to start a new branch of the Imperial Family on 1 December 1984. The Princess Takamado has three daughters, one of whom remains a member of the Imperial Family:
 Princess Tsuguko of Takamado (born 6 March 1986)

Family tree

The following family tree shows the lineage of the contemporary members of the Imperial Family (living members in bold). Princesses who left the Imperial Family upon their marriage are indicated in italics:

Living former members
Four of the five daughters of Emperor Shōwa, the two daughters of the Prince Mikasa, the only daughter of the former Emperor Akihito, the second and third daughter of the Prince Takamado, and most recently, the eldest daughter of Prince Akishino, left the Imperial Family upon marriage, joining the husband's family and thus taking the surname of the husband. The eldest daughter of Emperor Shōwa married the eldest son of Prince Naruhiko Higashikuni in 1943. The Higashikuni family lost its imperial status in October 1947. The living former imperial princesses are:

 Atsuko Ikeda (born 7 March 1931), fourth daughter and fourth child of Emperor Shōwa and Empress Kōjun, surviving elder sister of Emperor Emeritus Akihito.
 Takako Shimazu (born 2 March 1939), fifth daughter and youngest child of Emperor Shōwa and Empress Kōjun, younger sister of Emperor Emeritus Akihito.
 Yasuko Konoe (born 26 April 1944), eldest daughter and eldest child of the Prince and Princess Mikasa.
 Masako Sen (born 23 October 1951), second daughter and fourth child of the Prince and Princess Mikasa.
 Sayako Kuroda (born 18 April 1969), third child and only daughter of Emperor Emeritus Akihito and Empress Emerita Michiko, younger sister of Emperor Naruhito.
 Noriko Senge (born 22 July 1988), second daughter of the Prince and Princess Takamado.
 Ayako Moriya (born 15 September 1990), third daughter of the Prince and Princess Takamado.
 Mako Komuro (born 23 October 1991), first daughter and eldest child of the Crown Prince and Crown Princess Akishino.

Additionally, there are several people of Imperial descent in the Fushimi cadet branch, which itself consists of a main branch and five extant sub-branches. However, there are still unofficial heads of the living collateral families. These are the living :

 
 
 
 
 
 

The Higashifushimi or Komatsu collateral branch became extinct in the male line in 1922, followed by the Nashimoto branch in 1951, Kachō or Kwachō branch in 1970, Yamashina branch in 1987, and Kitashirakawa branch in 2018. The main Fushimi branch will become extinct upon the death of the current head, Fushimi Hiroaki (b. 1932), as he has no male offspring to succeed him; although he does not have any sons, his adoptive grandnephew has male issue who can be expected to become the head of the Fushimi-no-miya.

Finances of the Imperial Family

Background 

The Japanese monarchy was considered to be among the wealthiest in the world until the end of World War II.
Before 1911, there was no distinction between the Imperial Crown Estates and the Emperor's personal properties. When the Imperial Property Law was enacted in January 1911, two categories were established namely hereditary (crown estates) and personal property of the Imperial Family. The Imperial Household Minister had the responsibility for observing any judicial proceedings concerning Imperial holdings. According to the law, Imperial properties were only taxable if there was no conflict with the Imperial House Law. However, crown estates could only be used for public or imperially-sanctioned undertakings. Personal properties of certain members of the Imperial Family, such as Empress Dowager, the Empress, Crown Prince and Crown Princess, the Imperial Grandson and the consort of the Imperial Grandson, in addition to properties held for Imperial Family members who were minors, were exempted from taxation.

Up to 1921, the Imperial Crown Estates comprised . In 1921, due to the poor economic situation in Japan,  of crown lands (26%) were sold or transferred to the Japanese government and the private sector. In 1930, the Nagoya Detached Palace (Nagoya Castle) was donated to the city of Nagoya and six other imperial villas were sold or donated. In 1939, Nijō Castle was donated to the city of Kyoto. The former Kyoto residence of the Tokugawa shogunate which became an imperial palace in the Meiji Restoration, was donated to the city of Kyoto.

At the end of 1935, the Imperial Court owned  landed estates according to official government figures.  of that was the Emperor's private lands. It comprised palace complexes, forest and farm lands and other residential and commercial properties. The total economic value of the Imperial properties was estimated at ¥650 million in 1935 which is approximately US$195 million at prevailing exchange rates and $19.9 billion . Emperor Shōwa's personal fortune was an additional hundreds of millions of yen (estimated over $6 billion ). It included numerous family heirlooms and furnishings, purebred livestock and investments in major Japanese firms, such as the Bank of Japan, other major Japanese banks, the Imperial Hotel and Nippon Yusen.

After World War II, all of the 11 collateral branches of the Imperial Family were abolished under the Allied occupation of Japan, and the subsequent constitutional reforms imposed under Allied supervision forced those families to sell their assets to private or government owners. Staff numbers of the Imperial Household Ministry were slashed from roughly 6000 to about 1000. The largest imperial divestments were the former imperial Kiso and Amagi forest lands in Gifu and Shizuoka prefectures, grazing lands for livestock in Hokkaido and a stock farm in the Chiba region. They were all transferred to the Ministry of Agriculture, Forestry and Fisheries. Imperial property holdings were further reduced since 1947 after several handovers to the government. When Emperor Shōwa died, he left a personal fortune of £11 million in 1989. In 2017, Emperor Akihito had an estimated net worth of US$40 million.

Property 

Currently the primary Imperial properties are the Tokyo Imperial Palace and the Kyoto Imperial Palace. The Tōgū Palace is located in the larger Akasaka Estate where numerous other Imperial Family members reside. There are privately used imperial villas in Hayama, Nasu and the Suzaki Imperial Villa in Shimoda. The Katsura Imperial Villa, Shugakuin Imperial Villa and Sentō Imperial Palace are in Kyoto. There are a number of Imperial farms, residences and game preserves. The Imperial Household Agency administers the Shosoin Imperial Repository in Nara. The Imperial properties are all owned by the State.

Budget 

The Emperor can spend £150 million of public money annually. The imperial palaces are all owned and paid for by the State.

Until 2003, facts about the Japanese Imperial Family's life and finances were kept secret behind the "Chrysanthemum Curtain."

Staff 

The Japanese Imperial Family has a staff of more than 1,000 people (47 servants per royal). There are 30 archaeologists to protect the 895 imperial tombs. There is a silkworm breeder of the Momijiyama Imperial Cocoonery. The Emperor has four doctors on standby 24 hours a day, five men manage his wardrobe and 11 assist in Shinto rites.

The Imperial Palace in Tokyo has 160 servants who maintain it. This is partly due to demarcation rules, such as a maid who wipes a table cannot also wipe the floor. There are also separate stewards in charge of handling silverware and the crystal. The Kyoto Imperial Palace has a staff of 78 people. There are also 67 who care for the horses at the Tochigi ranch. There are scores of additional staff for the summer palaces at the beach and in the mountains.

Expenditure 

The Imperial Palace has a £2 million-a-year clinic with 42 staff and 8 medical departments. An example of lavish spending is the prior redecoration of a room for £140,000 where Crown Princess Masako gave birth to Princess Aiko in 2001. Emperor Akihito spent £140,000 on building a wine cellar. It has 4,500 bottles of 11 types of white wine and seven types of red such as Chateau Mouton Rothschild (1982) and champagne Dom Perignon (1992).

The Imperial properties includes a  farm which supplies produce and meat for the Imperial Family. The farm costs were £3 million per year ; the emperor and his family had a monthly water bill of approximately £50,000, also .

The Imperial Guard is a special over 900 strong police force that provides personal protection for the Emperor and other members of the Imperial Family including their residences for £48 million per year.

The Imperial Household owns and operates a fleet of Toyota Century motor vehicles, designated "Empresses", for exclusive use of the Imperial Household. In 2006, the Imperial Household Agency took delivery of the first of four bespoke Toyota Century Royals. The first of these specially prepared vehicles, Empress 1, serve as the official state car of the Emperor. Two Century Royals, Empress 3 and Empress 5, were assigned to the Ministry of Foreign Affairs for special use by visiting dignitaries and foreign heads of state. The last, Empress 2, was built in 2008 as a hearse exclusively for imperial funerals. Despite the imperial family's extravagant expenditures, there is a limitation with travel expenses since the Emperor's entourage pays a maximum of £110 a night, regardless of the actual cost of the hotel. Hotels accept it since they regard it as an honour to host the Imperial Family.

Aside from the inner court (the Emperor and Empress, and their children including the Crown Prince and Crown Princess), the civil list covers an additional 19 family members who live in imperial residences. They are not prohibited from holding jobs or running businesses. For example, Prince Tomohito of Mikasa, his wife and two daughters receive £310,000 per year, but they are not well known by the Japanese public and have few imperial duties.

The real annual cost was estimated to be $325 million per year, also .

Involvement in War

World War II

Members of the imperial family, including Naruhiko, Prince Higashikuni, Yasuhito, Prince Chichibu, Takahito, Prince Mikasa and Tsuneyoshi, Prince Takeda, were involved in human experimentation programs in various ways, which included authorizing, funding, supplying, and inspecting biomedical facilities.

Since 1978, the emperor of Japan has never visited Yasukuni Shrine due to Emperor Shōwa's displeasure over the enshrinement of convicted Class-A war criminals.

Support
A 1997 survey by Asahi Shimbun showed that 82% of Japanese supported the continuation of the monarchy. Polls after showed  of respondents were "indifferent" towards it. The imperial system is considered a symbol of the country, it provides a sense of linkage, purpose, spiritual core, diplomatic role as ambassador and a source of tradition and stability.  A small percentage argue that the imperial system is out of date, not in sync with the contemporary times.

Imperial standards currently in use

See also
 Family tree of Japanese monarchs
 List of emperors of Japan
 Imperial Regalia of Japan
 Tokyo Imperial Palace
 Three Palace Sanctuaries
 Kyoto Imperial Palace
 Akasaka Palace
 Ie (Japanese family system)

Related terms

Notes

References

External links

The official website of the Imperial Household Agency
Japan Zone | The Imperial Family
Imperial family news at The Japan Times

 

 
Japan
Japanese clans
Japan history-related lists
Lists of Japanese people